Irina Anatoleyvna Yarovaya (born in Makiivka, Donetsk Oblast, Ukrainian SSR, 17 October 1966) née Chernyakhovskaya is a Russian political figure, a Deputy Chairman of the State Duma from United Russia Party and a member of her party's General Council.

She has authored or co-authored multiple laws, including the toughening of responsibility for violating the rules of holding rallies, tightening immigration, criminal libel and registration requirements for 'foreign agents' for non-profit organizations with foreign funding. In 2014, she sponsored a bill prohibiting rehabilitation of Nazism. Another law known as the Yarovaya Law required in particular that telecommunications providers record all of their traffic and keep the record for three years (later shortened to six months). The first version of this counter-terrorism bill would have made it a criminal offense to fail reporting suspicious activities potentially linked with terrorism. This bill's language was subsequently watered down by the Duma.

Yarovaya is generally considered a reactionary, in that she sponsored laws limiting civil freedom in the name of state security. She was accused of producing low-quality bills possibly contradicting the Constitution of Russia.

Political biography
From 1997 to 2007, she was a member in Yabloko Party, and was elected to the Council of People's Deputies of Kamchatka Oblast, where she served as head of the Kamchatka Regional Council, member of her party's Central Bureau and Vice-Chairman of her party.

She was elected to the 5th (2007) as well as the 6th (2011) and the 7th State Duma of the Russian Federation (2016). On 21 December 2011 she became the Head of the Parliamentary Committee for Security and Anti-Corruption.

On 27 June 2016 she was included in the election list of the United Russia Party as a frontrunner in the Far East region, which virtually guaranteed her being elected to the 7th State Duma in September 2016.

References

External links
Committee for Security and Anti-Corruption of the State Duma, official homepage

1966 births
People from Makiivka
Yabloko politicians
United Russia politicians
Recipients of the Order of Honour (Russia)
Living people
21st-century Russian politicians
21st-century Russian women politicians
Fifth convocation members of the State Duma (Russian Federation)
Sixth convocation members of the State Duma (Russian Federation)
Seventh convocation members of the State Duma (Russian Federation)
Eighth convocation members of the State Duma (Russian Federation)